The Campaign for World Government was established in 1937 by prominent feminists and peace activists Rosika Schwimmer and Lola Maverick Lloyd. It was the first World Federalist Organization in the 20th century.

In 1937, disenchanted with the League of Nations and its perceived weaknesses, they announced the Campaign's mission to promote a federal world government directly representing the interests of the world's people, as opposed to the interests of states. While the specific methods promoted for achieving this goal shifted over the next several decades, the Campaign adhered to the concept of a populist global federalism throughout its existence.

The Campaign's early platform was outlined in 1937 in their pamphlet "Chaos, War or a New World Order?" which called for the creation of a World Constitutional Convention. At this convention, it was hoped, a framework for a Federation of Nations would be formed, and democratic elections to the federation would be scheduled. Schwimmer and Lloyd included a tentative plan for this novel federal body, including full membership for all countries, direct representation, and several organs of government. Among the plan's elements were a new international date system, the abolition of all military bodies, the peaceful transfer of people out of population-dense regions, and a combined global free-trade and command economy.

Over time, as Schwimmer and Lloyd recognized the increasing unlikelihood of national governments voluntarily forming a world government, their plan shifted emphasis to the peaceful popular demand for the election of such a body. Following this shift, the Campaign began to focus on national consciousness-raising and international conferences of other like-minded groups.

References

Organizations established in 1937
Non-profit organizations based in the United States
World federalist movement member organizations
World government